Egyptian Futsal Championship is the premier futsal league in Egypt. The competition is run by the Egyptian Futsal League under the auspices of the Egyptian Football Association.

List of champions

?
 2014–15: Misr Lel Makkasa SC
 2015–16: 
 2016–17: 
 2017–18: 
 2018–19: Misr Lel Makkasa SC

See also
Egyptian Futsal Cup

External links
Official website

 

Futsal competitions in Egypt
futsal
Egypt
Futsal